Leigh Hamilton (December 20, 1949 – September 8, 2012) was a New Zealand-born American actress and art gallery owner.

Hamilton was born in Auckland, New Zealand, on December 20, 1949, to parents, Colleen and Derek Hiene. She moved to the United States to pursue acting. She began her career with small television roles during the 1970s, including parts on Kojak, The Mod Squad, Baretta, Banyon, and McMillan & Wife.

Hamilton co-starred in several films from the 1970s to the 1990s, including A Man, a Woman, and a Bank in 1979, Forced Vengeance in 1982, and Gas Food Lodging in 1992. She was also cast in smaller parts 1987's P.K. and the Kid and Hocus Pocus, a 1993 Halloween-themed comedic film starring Sarah Jessica Parker, Bette Midler, and Kathy Najimy.

In 1994, Hamilton opened the Hamilton Galleries  in the Pacific Palisades, Los Angeles, and simultaneously left acting to focus on her art business. She represented California-based artists, including Brooke Adams, who had co-starred with Hamilton in A Man, a Woman, and a Bank and Gas Food Lodging. The Hamilton Galleries are now located on Ocean Avenue in Santa Monica, California, as of 2012.

Leigh Hamilton died at Saint John's Health Center in Santa Monica, California, on September 8, 2012, at the age of 62. She was survived by her husband, Warren Long, to whom she had been married for nineteen years; their daughter, Tallulah; and her four brothers.

References

External links

2012 deaths
American film actresses
American television actresses
American art dealers
Women art dealers
New Zealand emigrants to the United States
People from Auckland
Actresses from Santa Monica, California
1949 births
20th-century American actresses
20th-century American businesspeople
20th-century American businesswomen
21st-century American businesspeople
21st-century American businesswomen
Art gallery owners